Miguel Angel Castillo Flores (born 30 September 1983) is a Honduran football player, who currently plays for Victoria in the Honduran National League.

Club career
Castillo has played four years for Broncos UNAH, then moved to Motagua and Olimpia where he started his career.

When at Motagua, he and his brother joined a training camp in Turkey to try to seal a contract with an overseas club.

In summer 2012, new Olimpia coach Danilo Tosello deemed Castillo surplus to requirements and he subsequently joined Victoria.

International career
He made his debut for Honduras in a May 2008 friendly match against Belize and has earned a total of 6 caps, scoring no goals. He has represented his country in 2 FIFA World Cup qualification matches and played at the 2009 CONCACAF Gold Cup.

His final international was a July 2009 CONCACAF Gold Cup match against Haiti.

Personal life
Castillo was born in Tegucigalpa and, with his brother, raised by his father Miguel Ángel since their mother left them at an early age. His brother Fernando Castillo played alongside him at Olimpia and Motagua.

References

External links

 "Me faltan 24 clases para graduarme" - Diez 

1983 births
Living people
Sportspeople from Tegucigalpa
Association football midfielders
Honduran footballers
Honduras international footballers
2009 CONCACAF Gold Cup players
2013 Copa Centroamericana players
F.C. Motagua players
C.D. Olimpia players
C.D. Victoria players
Liga Nacional de Fútbol Profesional de Honduras players